Kaveripattinam is a town  in Krishnagiri district in the northern part of Tamil Nadu.It is a revenue block in the Krishnagiri district of Tamil Nadu, India. It has a total of 36 panchayat villages.

Geography
It has an average elevation of 533m. This town has a cool climate.It lies on the bank of the river Then Pennai and it has a green and cool climate. It is located on NH-7. It is 100 km from Bangalore, 30 km from Dharmapuri, 10 km from Krishnagiri. The town is very green because of the KRP Dam nearby and rich in water resources.

The nearest Railway station is at Palakkodu while the Airport is at Bangalore. NH-44 provides better road connectivity.

Demographics
As of 2011 India census, Kaveripattinam had a population of 25000. Males constitute 50% of the population and females 50%. Kaveripattanam has an average literacy rate of 74%, higher than the national average of 59.5%: male literacy is 81%, and female literacy is 67%. In Kaveripattanam, 11% of the population is under 6 years of age.

Kaveripattinam comes under Krishnagiri District.

Economy

Kaveripattanam is famous for its cultivation of mangoes.  There are a lot of mango pulp industries, milk processing units, and small-scale industries. This town is also known for a milk sweet called Palkova apart from Srivilliputhur and Gudiyatham. The journal and book publisher REST Publisher is also registered in Kaveripattanam. Kaveripattinam is a special place for Nippet industries and Match industries.
Farming is primary occupation in Kaveripattinam. These industries provide considerable size of employment to the citizens of the town.

All major nationalized banks such as State Bank of India, Canara bank, Indian Bank, Indian Overseas Bank, private banks and Cooperative Banks have their branches in Kaveripattinam.

Politics
Kaveripattanam assembly constituency is part of Krishnagiri (Lok Sabha constituency).

References

Cities and towns in Krishnagiri district